The Face of Love is a 2013 American romantic drama film directed by Arie Posin and co-written by Matthew McDuffie. The film stars Annette Bening, Ed Harris, Robin Williams, Amy Brenneman, Jess Weixler and Linda Park. It was screened in the Special Presentation section at the 2013 Toronto International Film Festival.

Plot
Nikki (Bening) is a recent widow whose husband, Garret (Ed Harris), died in a drowning accident; Nikki has not yet gotten over it. Objects, people and situations that remind Nikki of the love of her life still haunt her. Resigned to life alone, Nikki visits an art gallery she often frequented with Garret and sees a man (Harris in a dual role) whose resemblance to her husband stuns her.  She returns to the gallery several more times, hoping to see him.  Eventually, Nikki identifies him as a professor at a small local college.  She finds "Tom" on the internet and visits an art class he is teaching; but she is emotionally overwhelmed and flees.  Eventually, Nikki calms down and invites Tom to give her private, at home,  tutoring in painting.  She doesn't disclose to him his physical resemblance to her late husband.

Nikki and Tom become lovers, to the emotional distress of her neighbor (Robin Williams), who has hoped to attract her interest romantically since the death of Garret, his friend.  The strain of keeping Tom a secret from her friends and family, who would immediately recognize the uncanny resemblance, begins to wear on Nikki, Tom, and the relationship.  Nikki is not alone in keeping secrets in the relationship.  Tom, who is divorced for 10 years from his ex-wife yet still maintains a close friendship with her, does not tell Nikki he suffers from a severe heart ailment.   When Nikki’s adult daughter Summer visits unexpectedly, finding Tom at the house, she flies into a rage repulsed by Tom’s appearance.  Tom believes her outrage is triggered simply by his presence.   
Tom, puzzled by the daughter's reaction, accepts when Nikki asks him to fly off to Mexico with her. At a resort often visited by Garret and Nikki when they were married, Tom discovers a photo of Nikki and her husband by the bar, notices the resemblance and also realizes that a psychologically imbalanced Nikki has brought him to the very place her husband died.  Tom confronts her with the resemblance and Nikki runs off into the raging surf, perhaps to commit suicide.  She is rescued by Tom and they later hold one another in bed with the knowledge the relationship isn't based on anything more than his physical similarity to Garret and is doomed.

A year later, Summer finds an art gallery card in Nikki's mail that turns out to be an invitation to a memorial display of Tom's art.  Tom has died of his heart condition but produced an outpouring of art in his last year.  Nikki attends the reception hosted by Tom's ex-wife and tearfully sees Tom's painting of the two of them titled "The Face of Love". He has painted a haunting self portrait of himself with Nikki standing in her pool at her home looking at him.

Cast 
 Annette Bening as Nikki
 Ed Harris as Tom/Garrett
 Robin Williams as Roger
 Amy Brenneman as Ann, Tom's ex-wife
 Jess Weixler as Summer
 Linda Park as Jan
 Jeffrey Vincent Parise
 Kim Farris as Hostess
 Leah Shaw as Farmers market shopper
 Chelsea O'Connor as Gallery Waitress
 Deana Molle' as Couple #2
 Yuki Bird as Waitress

Production

Filming 
The film was shot in Los Angeles in 2012, and produced by Mockingbird Pictures.

Release 
In May 2013 IFC Films acquired the rights of the film to distribute in the United States. The film was released in September 2013.

Reception
On Rotten Tomatoes, The Face of Love has an approval rating of 43% based on 74 reviews, with a rating of 5.2/10. The site's critical consensus reads, "Perhaps worth checking out if only for the opportunity to see reliably powerful work from Annette Bening and Ed Harris, The Face of Love undermines its leads' performances with a scattershot script and aimless direction." On Metacritic, the film has a score of 51 out of 100, based on 24 critics, indicating "mixed or average reviews".

References

External links 
 

2013 films
Films scored by Marcelo Zarvos
Films directed by Arie Posin
Films produced by Bonnie Curtis
Films set in Los Angeles
Films shot in Los Angeles
American psychological drama films
2013 romantic drama films
American romantic drama films
Films about death
Films about widowhood
2010s English-language films
2010s American films
English-language romantic drama films